Li puntigli delle donne is a 1796 opera, a farsetta for six voices, by Gaspare Spontini first performed at Teatro della Pallacorda of the Accademia degli Intrepidi, Florence.

Cast 
Giannina, Daughter of a rich country farmer intende to be the count's bride (mezzo soprano)
Doctor Mangiacarte, elder brother of the count (bass)
Count Brontolone, intended bridegroom of Giannina (baritone)
Valerio, son of the count and husband of Countess Rosimene (tenor)
Countess Rosimene, wife of Valerio (soprano)
Cavalier del Ciufolo, protector of Giannina (tenor)
Lisetta, Countess Rosimene's maid (soprano)
2 flute, 2 oboes, 2 horns, strings, b.c.

Recordings
The opera was revived in June 1998 at the Putbus Festival under Wilhelm Keitel and the recording issued on Arte Nova. 
Another recording with Ernesto Palacio,  Gianpiero Ruggeri,  Susanna Rigacci,  Alessandra Ruffini, conducted Alberto Zedda Dynamic 1999

References

Operas by Gaspare Spontini
Italian-language operas
1796 operas
Operas